Welch Township is one of ten townships in Cape Girardeau County, Missouri, USA.  As of the 2000 census, its population was 1,344.

History
Welch Township was founded in 1856. The township was named for M. Welch, a local judge.

Geography
It contains two cemeteries: Hitt and Kenyon.

Round Pond (historical) is within this township.

References

 USGS Geographic Names Information System (GNIS)

External links
 US-Counties.com
 City-Data.com

Townships in Cape Girardeau County, Missouri
Cape Girardeau–Jackson metropolitan area
Townships in Missouri